Harold "Harry" Johnston was an Irish footballer who played for Portadown. He featured once for the Ireland national football team in 1927, scoring two goals.

Career statistics

International

International goals
Scores and results list Ireland's goal tally first.

References

Date of birth unknown
Date of death unknown
Pre-1950 IFA international footballers
Association football forwards
Portadown F.C. players
Association footballers from Northern Ireland